A universal coronavirus vaccine, also known as a pan coronavirus vaccine, is a theoretical coronavirus vaccine that would be effective against all coronavirus strains. A universal vaccine would provide protection against coronavirus strains that have caused disease in humans, such as SARS-CoV-2 (including all its variants), while also providing protection against future coronavirus strains. Such a vaccine has been proposed to prevent or mitigate future coronavirus epidemics and pandemics.

Efforts to develop a universal coronavirus vaccine began in early 2020. In December 2021, NIAID director Anthony Fauci, virologist Jeffery K. Taubenberger, and David M. Morens endorsed the development of durable universal coronavirus vaccines and advocated in favor of "an international collaborative effort to extensively sample coronaviruses from bats as well as wild and farmed animals to help understand the full 'universe' of existing and emerging coronaviruses", including already identified animal coronaviruses with pandemic potential. In March 2022, the White House released the "National COVID-19 Preparedness Plan", which, in part, discusses plans to "accelerate research and development toward a single COVID vaccine that protects against SARS-CoV-2 and all its variants, as well as previous SARS-origin viruses".

Strategies 
One strategy for developing such vaccines was developed at Walter Reed Army Institute of Research (WRAIR). It uses a spike ferritin-based nanoparticle (SpFN). This vaccine began a Phase I clinical trial in April 2022.

Another is to hang vaccine fragments from multiple strains on a nanoparticle scaffold. Universality is enhanced by targeting the receptor-binding domain rather than the spike protein.

Projects 

Pan-coronavirus vaccine candidates include variant-proof vaccines such as SpFN, developed by the US Army. It uses a ferritin nanoparticle with prefusion-stabilized spike antigens from the Wuhan strain. Another candidates is RBD–scNP, which is a sortase A-conjugated ferritin nanoparticle with RBD antigens. |GRT-R910 is a self-amplifying mRNA delivering spike and T cell epitopes. hAd5-S+N delivers spike and nucleocapsid antigens via human adenovirus serotype 5 vector. MigVax-101 is an adjuvanted oral subunit vaccine with RBD and nucleocapsid domains.

Among the pan-sarbecovirus vaccines are GBP511, a mosaic nanoparticle containing RBDs from SARS-CoV-1, SARS-CoV-2 and 1–2 bat coronaviruses. Another vaccine candidate, which is entering clinical development, is Mosaic-8b, a mosaic nanoparticle containing RBDs from SARS-CoV-2 and 7 animal coronaviruses. VBI-2901 uses virus-like particles expressing prefusion spike of SARS-CoV-2, SARS-CoV-1 and MERS-CoV. UB-612 contains SARS-CoV-2 S1-RBD protein and synthetic peptides representing T cell (Th and CTL) epitopes on the nucleocapsid, spike and membrane proteins.

Pan-betacoronavirus vaccines include DIOS-CoVax, a needle-free antigen injection.

See also 
 Universal flu vaccine
 COVID-19 vaccine

References 

COVID-19 vaccines
Animal virology
Coronaviridae
Virus subfamilies
SARS-CoV-2